Mantinia may refer to:
 Mantinia, an alternative spelling of Mantineia, Greece
 , a tank ship in service with the Greek Tanker Shipping Co, Piraeus from 1963 to 1977